The Swedish Ski Games is an annual cross-country skiing event in Sweden. The games started in Sundsvall in 1947 but moved to Falun in 1959. Up to 1991, ski jumping and Nordic combined skiing were also included as a recurring event. Included were also alpine skiing between 1950–1953 (in Åre) and biathlon in 1984. Since 1992, the Swedish Ski Games has arranged international cross-country skiing events only. The event is usually held in February–March as one of the final World Cup competitions during the season. The event is usually held at Lugnet. Lack of snow has sometimes required the event to be moved to other places.

History
Inspired by Norwegian skiing events Holmennkollrennene (Holmenkollen Ski Festival) and finnish Lahti Ski Games, the Swedish Ski Games were created in 1947. In the inaugural games, only four nations; Sweden, Norway, Finland and Switzerland attended. In the early years, several venues alternated as host of the games. As a result of a 1957 proposal from the skiing association of Dalarna, Falun took over as hosts; first on trial from 1959 to 1962, later on a permanent basis. In 1979, the Swedish Ski Games was part of the unofficial World Cup season. Since the official FIS Cross-Country World Cup began with the 1981–82 season, the Swedish Ski Games has been included every year with exceptions of years hosting the Nordic World Ski Championships instead. Ski jumping and Nordic combined were included at the program until 1991.

Events

1947 – Sundsvall
1948 – Östersund
1949 – Sollefteå
1950 – Östersund
1951 – Sundsvall
1952 – Falun
1953 – Boden
1954 – Falun (combined with the World Ski Championships)
1955 – Stockholm-Nässjö
1956 – Falun
1957 – Sollefteå
1958 – No competitions held
1959 – Falun
1960 – Falun/Sälen/Transtrand
1961 – Falun
1962 – Falun/Bjursås
1963 – Falun
1964 – Kiruna
1965 – Falun
1966 – Umeå/Örnsköldsvik
1967 – Falun
1968 – Falun
1969 – Falun
1970 – Falun
1971 – Falun/Bjursås
1972 – Lycksele
1973 – Falun
1974 – Falun (combined with the World Ski Championships)
1975 – Falun
1976 – Falun
1977 – Falun
1978 – Falun
1979 – Falun
1980 – Falun (women's 20 kilometers world championship)
1981 – Falun
1982 – Falun
1983 – Falun
1984 – Falun
1985 – Falun
1986 – Falun
1987 – Falun
1988 – Falun
1989 – Falun
1990 – Lycksele/Örnsköldsvik
1991 – Falun
1992 – Falun
1993 – Falun (combined with the World Ski Championships)
1994 – Falun
1995 – Falun
1996 – Falun
1997 – Falun
1998 – Falun
1999 – Falun
2000 – Falun
2001 – Falun
2002 – Falun
2003 – Falun
2004 – Falun
2005 – Falun
2006 – Falun
2007 – Falun
2008 – Falun
2009 – Falun
2010 – Falun
2011 – Falun
2012 – Falun
2013 – Falun
2014 – Falun
2015 – Falun (combined with the World Ski Championships)
2016 – Falun
2017 – Falun
2018 – Falun
2019 – Falun
2020 – Falun
2021 – Falun

References

External links

Official website 
Earlier winners 

1947 establishments in Sweden
February sporting events
March sporting events
Recurring sporting events established in 1947
Sports competitions in Falun
Cross-country skiing competitions in Sweden
International speed skating competitions hosted by Sweden